

Medal summary

Men

Women

Mixed

Medal table

External links
  2011 Southeast Asian Games

2011 Southeast Asian Games events
Southeast Asian Games
2011
Sailing competitions in Indonesia